Emmalyn Paulette Moody (born February 17, 1945), known professionally as Lynne Moody, is an American film and television actress. Beginning her career in the early 1970s, Moody is best known her roles as Tracy Curtis–Taylor in the ABC television sitcom That's My Mama (1974–1975), Irene Harvey in Roots (1977), Roots: The Next Generations (1979), and Patricia Williams in Knots Landing (1988–1990).

Biography

Early life and education
Born in Detroit, Michigan, Moody was raised in Evanston, Illinois, a north suburb of Chicago, Illinois. Moody's mother was a social worker, her father worked as a doctor for a Chicago-area hospital. For high school, Moody attended Evanston Township High School, graduating in 1963. Moody worked as a stewardess prior to relocating to Los Angeles for her acting career.

Career
In 1970, Moody moved to Los Angeles where she was initially hired to work as a playboy bunny at a Playboy Club. While working at the Playboy Club, Moody studied acting at the Pasadena Playhouse. (Moody later studied at Goodman Theatre and Hull House.) In 1973, Moody landed her first role as Denny in the American blaxploitation horror film Scream Blacula Scream. Moody was the original Jenny Willis when the character was introduced in an episode of All in the Family titled "Lionel's Engagement" in 1974. By the time the pilot episode of The Jeffersons aired in January 1975, the role was recast with Berlinda Tolbert replacing her as Jenny Willis.

In the fall of 1974, Moody landed the role of Tracy Curtis-Taylor in the ABC television series That's My Mama with Clifton Davis and Theresa Merritt. Moody portrayed the character throughout the series first season, later being replaced by Joan Pringle at the beginning of the second season. According to a 1975 JET article, Moody's manager Michael Kogg described Moody's exit from the show as "she didn't like the part anymore". After her exit from That's My Mama, Moody received a starring role in women in prison exploitation TV-movie Nightmare in Badham County, later released to theaters as Nightmare in 1976.

In 1977, Moody portrayed Irene Harvey in Alex Haley's ABC television mini-series Roots. Moody later reprised her role in Roots: The Next Generations which aired in February 1979. From 1979 until 1980, Moody portrayed Polly Dawson in the ABC program Soap. Moody had other television roles such as,  Patricia Williams in Knots Landing, and Nurse Julie Williams in E/R. In 2000, Moody had a recurring role on the hit ABC daytime drama series, General Hospital as Florence Campbell.

Other ventures 
In the 1990s, Moody participated in public service radio spots for Africare to help improve the livelihood of Africans, along with fellow Roots cast members Georg Stanford Brown and Louis Gossett Jr.

Personal life 
Moody never married and has one child. Moody gave birth to a daughter on December 10, 1964, whom she gave up for adoption. In June 2018, Moody was reunited with her daughter, named Lisa Wright. Wright found Moody by doing a 23andMe DNA test with the aid of Moody's brother. Prior to being reunited with her daughter, Moody spent years searching for her daughter even enlisting the help of Alex Haley.

Filmography

Notes

References

External links 
 

1945 births
1946 births
1950 births
Age controversies
Actresses from Detroit
African-American actresses
American television actresses
Living people
American voice actresses
20th-century American actresses
21st-century American actresses
20th-century African-American women
20th-century African-American people
21st-century African-American women
21st-century African-American people